Bembecia lomatiaeformis is a moth of the family Sesiidae. It is found from Greece to Turkey and the Caucasus.

The wingspan is 28–34 mm.

The larvae feed on the roots of Astragalus species, including Astragalus angustifolius and Astragalus creticus rumelicus.

References

Moths described in 1853
Sesiidae
Moths of Europe
Moths of Asia